Moein Rahimi (born 2 May 1989 in Oroumieh) is an Iranian volleyball player and former member of Iran men's national volleyball team.

He has 12 years of experience playing in the Iranian Volleyball Super League and playing in teams such as Azarpayam, Shahrdari Urmia, and Saipa Tehran.

Sporting career

National 

 World U19 Championships
 : Baja California, Mexico, 2007
 Asian U19 Championships
 : Kuala Lumpur, Malaysia, 2007
 : Colombo, Sri Lanka, 2008
 World Military Volleyball Championships (CISM)
 : Tehran, Iran, 2009
 : Rio de Janeiro, Brazil, 2012

Club 
  Runner-up: Saipa Karaj, 2009–2010
  Third place: Pegah Urmia, 2007–2008
  Third place: BEEM Mazandaran, 2008–2009

References

External links 
 

1989 births
Iranian men's volleyball players
Living people
People from Tehran